The 1970 Asia Golf Circuit was the ninth season of golf tournaments that comprised the Asia Golf Circuit, formerly known as the Far East Circuit. 

Ben Arda of the Philippines won the circuit overall prize.

Schedule
The table below shows the 1970 Asia Golf Circuit schedule. With the addition of the Indian and South Korean tournaments the circuit expanded to nine legs.

Final standings
The Asia Golf Circuit standings were based on a points system.

References

Asia Golf Circuit
Asia Golf Circuit